Giuseppe Abbamonte (1759–1818) was a Neapolitan statesman who became secretary-general of the Cisalpine Republic in 1798 and a member of the Executive Committee at Naples. Upon the restoration of the king in 1799, he moved to Milan where he continued to do his job until 1805.

Biography
While living in Naples he adhered to the Jacobin ideals. The Jacobins were very different politically than those who held power at the time. They were radical in the time of change during the revolution. In 1794, after being involved in a conspiracy, he was forced to flee to Oneglia. He then lived in Loano and Milan, where he published the "Saggio leggi fondamentali dell'Italia libera" (Essay on the fundamental laws of Italian liberty) in 1797. In Milan he also founded the "Giornale dei Patrioti italiani" (Newspaper of the Italian patriots) and collaborated with the "Monitore italiano" (Italian monitor).

In 1798 he became general inspector of the ministry of police of the Cisalpine Republic, but later on, he was arrested for causing political conflicts.

After the proclamation of the Neapolitan Republic, despite being absent from the city, he was called up to be a part of the provisional government. He arrived in Naples in the second half of February 1799, and organized the court of justice. He was at first appointed as a Chairman of the Central Committee, and later of the Executive Committee.

He participated in the defence of the city against the Sanfedist troops. The full name of the Sanfedismo troops was the Army of Holy Faith in our Lord Jesus Christ. This group was a peasant army that became popular and wanted to resist the new French republic. After the surrender, he was supposed to go to Toulon together with the other Neapolitan patriots, but the winning party broke the agreement and imprisoned them. Abbamonte was sentenced to death by the State Council but, because he surrendered, the punishment was changed to life imprisonment.

He was liberated in 1801 and went to Milan, and in the end returned to Naples permanently when Joseph Bonaparte became king of the city. Here he held important roles in the magistracy and was later appointed as state counsellor by Joachim Murat. After the restoration, he still remained in the city, under the reign of Ferdinando, and was appointed as counsellor of the supreme court of justice.

References

1759 births
1818 deaths
18th-century Italian politicians
Cisalpine Republic